"A Heart Full of Love (For a Handful of Kisses)" is a 1948 single by Eddy Arnold.  

Written by Arnold, Steve Nelson and Ray Soehnel, the song was Arnold's eighth number one, where it spent one week at the top of the Best Seller lists.  The b-side of "A Heart Full of Love (For a Handful of Kisses)", is a song titled, "Then I Turned and Slowly Walked Away" hit number four on the Folk Best Seller lists.

References

1948 songs
Eddy Arnold songs
Songs written by Eddy Arnold
Songs written by Steve Nelson (songwriter)